First Christian Church is a historic church at 2000 E. Kessler Boulevard in Longview, Washington.

It was built in 1930 and was added to the National Register in 1985.

References

Churches on the National Register of Historic Places in Washington (state)
Gothic Revival church buildings in Washington (state)
Churches completed in 1930
Buildings and structures in Cowlitz County, Washington
National Register of Historic Places in Cowlitz County, Washington